Šime Špralja (born December 6, 1983) is a Croatian professional basketball player who plays for Sonik-Puntamika of the Croatian HT Premijer liga.

References

External links 
Eurobasket.com Profile
FIBA.com Profile

1983 births
Living people
ABA League players
Centers (basketball)
Basketball Nymburk players
Croatian expatriate basketball people in France
Croatian men's basketball players
HKK Široki players
KK Split players
KK Zadar players
Olympique Antibes basketball players
Power forwards (basketball)
Basketball players from Zadar
Trefl Sopot players
Vanoli Cremona players
KK Kvarner 2010 players
KK Borik Puntamika players